Florence Gunderson Klingensmith (3 September 1904 – 4 September 1933) was an American aviator of the Golden Age of Air Racing.  She was also a founding member of the Ninety-Nines, a women's pilot group.  She was one of the first women to participate in air races with men.  She died in an accident during the Frank Phillips Trophy Race at the 1933 International Air Races in Chicago, Illinois.

Life
Florence Edith Gunderson was born September 3, 1904 to Gustave and Florence (Parker) Gunderson on their small farm in Oakport Township, Minnesota.  She was baptized in the Oak Mound Congregational Church and attended the Oak Mound Consolidated School in Kragnes Township with her sister Myrtle and brothers George and Roy.  Her father "Gust" worked at Oak Mound School as a janitor and school bus driver and was the clerk of Oak Mound Church.  The family moved to Moorhead, Minnesota around 1918, where the daredevil Florence took up riding motorcycles - very fast!  She met Charles Klingensmith and they married on 25 June 1927, but within a year and a half the two had split.

In August, 1928 Charles Lindbergh visited Fargo, North Dakota, where she was living at the time, inspiring Florence to take flying lessons.  In 1928, she attended Hanson Auto and Electrical School in Fargo. That summer, she agreed to be a skydiver in return for flight lessons from Edwin Mead Canfield.  Her first jump left her unconscious, but this did not deter her.

Over that winter she went door to door to persuade local business men to fund the purchase of a plane.  In return, Florence would promote Fargo and carry advertisements at fairs, flying meets, and air races.  Her persistence paid off.  As Fargo laundry owner William T. Lee said, "If you're willing to risk your neck, I'll risk my money."  He and other local business owners put up $3,000 to purchase a Monocoupe.  She picked it up and flew it back to Fargo's Hector Field, where she was working as a mechanics' apprentice, and christened it "Miss Fargo."  In June 1929 she became the first licensed woman pilot in North Dakota.  That summer she barnstormed county fairs, worked as operations manager at Hector, and flew in her first race, where she took fourth place.

On 19 April 1930, she set the woman's record for inside loops with 143 loops.  Unfortunately, no National Aeronautics Association members were present to make it official.  Laura Ingalls later raised her loop record to 980.  On 22 June 1931, before more than 50,000 spectators (and NAA officials), Florence took off from Wold Chamberlain Field at Minneapolis, Minnesota.  Four and one-half hours later she landed, "A trifle groggy and gagged by gas fumes," with a verified record of 1,078 loops.

At the 1931 National Air Races in Cleveland, Ohio she won four woman-only events and claimed $4,200 in prize money.  At the 1932 Nationals she won the most coveted prize in women's aviation, the Amelia Earhart Trophy, presented by Amelia Earhart herself and winning the grand prize of an Essex Terraplane automobile.

In 1932, she came second in the Shell Speed Dash, in a Monocoupe.

1933 International Air Races
In 1933 Florence was the first woman to enter the $10,000 Frank Phillips Trophy Race at the International Air Races in Chicago, Illinois. This race was the main event at the Nationals that year.

Florence flew a bright red Gee Bee Model Y Senior Sportster NR718Y, owned by Arthur Knapp of Jackson, Michigan.  The fabric-covered craft's original 220 horsepower (164 kW) Lycoming R-680 engine had been replaced with a 670 hp (500 kW) Wright Whirlwind.  Late in the afternoon of September 4, one day after her 29th birthday, Florence was flying in fourth place ahead of four male fliers, averaging over  through the first eight laps.  Then, just as she was passing the grand stands, a bit of red fabric fluttered down from the fuselage.  The stresses of the race were apparently too much for the overpowered light craft.  Florence immediately veered off the course and flew steady and level straight south to a plowed field a couple of miles away in Northfield Township.  Suddenly the plane nosed over into the ground from about  up.  Florence died instantly. Apparently she had attempted to bail out.  Her parachute was found tangled in the fuselage.
Organizers used her death as an excuse to bar women from the Air Races.

Florence's body was shipped back to Minnesota for the funeral.  The businessmen who had bankrolled Florence's first plane served as pallbearers and her funeral was held in the First Presbyterian Church of Fargo.  She was interred in the Gunderson family lot in Oak Mound Cemetery, Kragnes Township, a few miles from where she was born.

In June, 2015, the local Oak Mound 4-H Club erected a monument on Florence's grave in Oak Mound Cemetery, and it was dedicated during a ceremony on June 14, 2015. The completed monument consists of a brick pillar with a model of a red Gee Bee Model 'Y' Senior Sportster sitting atop, and a plaque complete with Florence's picture, biography, and a list of her accomplishments affixed to the front.

References

External links
"Florence Klingensmith", Minnesota Historical Society

1904 births
1933 deaths
Aviators from Minnesota
Victims of aviation accidents or incidents in 1933
Aviators killed in aviation accidents or incidents in the United States
Aerobatic record holders
American aviation record holders
American women aviation record holders
20th-century American women
20th-century American people
Sports competitors who died in competition
Accidental deaths in Illinois
People from Clay County, Minnesota